Haward refers to

 Francis Haward (1759–1797), engraver to H.R.H. the Prince of Wales
 John Warrington Haward (1841–1921), English surgeon
 Lazarus Haward 17th-century author
 Nicolas Haward 16th-century author